Parhez Banu Begum (21 August 1611 –  1675) was a Mughal princess, the first child and eldest daughter of Mughal emperor Shah Jahan from his first wife, Qandahari Begum. She was also the older half-sister of her father's successor, the sixth Mughal emperor Aurangzeb.

Life

Parhez was born on 21 August 1611 in Agra to Prince Khurram (the future emperor Shah Jahan) and his first wife Kandahari Begum. She was named 'Parhez Banu Begum' (Persian: "the abstinent Princess") by her paternal grandfather, Emperor Jahangir. However, in the Maasir-i-Alamgiri, she is referred to as Purhunar Banu Begum. Her father, Prince Khurram, was the third son of Emperor Jahangir, while her mother, Kandahari Begum, was a princess of the prominent Safavid dynasty of Iran (Persia) and was a daughter of Sultan Muzaffar Husain Mirza Safavi (who was a direct descendant of Shah Ismail I).

Parhez was Shah Jahan's first child and his eldest daughter and was brought up by the Ruqaiya Sultan Begum, who had been Emperor Akbar's first wife, and who had also brought up her father, Shah Jahan till the age of 13.

Although her mother was not Shah Jahan's favourite wife, nonetheless, she was loved by her father; who had earnestly requested his daughter, Jahanara Begum (his eldest daughter from Mumtaz Mahal) on his deathbed, to look after Parhez. She was also loved and well-cared for by her younger half-brother, Aurangzeb.

Death
Perhez died on 19 October 1675 in Delhi. The nobles of the subah buried her in the musoleum (garden) built by her.

Ancestry

References

1611 births
1675 deaths
Mughal princesses
Mughal nobility
Indian female royalty
Women of the Mughal Empire
17th-century Indian women
17th-century Indian people
Daughters of emperors